Rafael Romero Sandrea (May 22, 1938 – August 15, 2021) was a Venezuelan track and field athlete, who competed in the sprint events. He represented his native country in three consecutive Summer Olympics, starting in 1956. Romero won two medals (gold and silver) at the 1963 Pan American Games in Brazil.

References

External links
 

1938 births
2021 deaths
Sportspeople from Maracaibo
Venezuelan male sprinters
Olympic athletes of Venezuela
Athletes (track and field) at the 1956 Summer Olympics
Athletes (track and field) at the 1959 Pan American Games
Athletes (track and field) at the 1960 Summer Olympics
Athletes (track and field) at the 1963 Pan American Games
Athletes (track and field) at the 1964 Summer Olympics
Pan American Games gold medalists for Venezuela
Pan American Games silver medalists for Venezuela
Pan American Games medalists in athletics (track and field)
Central American and Caribbean Games gold medalists for Venezuela
Central American and Caribbean Games silver medalists for Venezuela
Competitors at the 1962 Central American and Caribbean Games
Central American and Caribbean Games medalists in athletics
Medalists at the 1959 Pan American Games
Medalists at the 1963 Pan American Games
20th-century Venezuelan people
21st-century Venezuelan people